Perilasius is a genus of beetles in the family Cerambycidae, containing the following species:

 Perilasius brunneus Franz, 1954
 Perilasius championi Bates, 1880

References

Hesperophanini